Raveesh Kumar is an Indian diplomat in the Indian Foreign Service. Currently he is an Indian ambassador to Finland also accredited to Estonia, residing in Helsinki. He was the former official spokesperson of the Ministry of External Affairs (MEA) in the Government of India. He was the youngest ever official spokesperson.  He was the Consul General of India in Frankfurt, Germany before being appointed as the spokesperson of the MEA.

Early life and education 
Raveesh Kumar was born in Nathnagar, Bhagalpur district of Bihar. He attended Mount Assisi School, Bhagalpur till class 10 after which he attended Delhi Public School, Mathura Road till class 12. He holds a bachelor's degree with Honours in History from Hansraj College, Delhi University.

Diplomatic career 
Kumar joined the Indian Foreign Service in 1995, through the Union Public Service Commission (UPSC) conducted Civil Service Examination. He started his diplomatic career at the Indian Mission in Jakarta, Indonesia in 1997. This was followed by posting in Thimpu, Bhutan as Second Secretary/First Secretary, where he looked after development assistance projects.  During his stint in New Delhi from 2004-2007, he was the Desk Officer at the East Asia desk, covering Japan and Republic of Korea. He was then posted to London, United Kingdom as Political Counsellor responsible for bilateral political relationships and engagements with the Parliament of the United Kingdom. Subsequently, he moved as Deputy Chief of Mission to Jakarta from September 2010 to August 2013, followed by his posting as Consul General of India in Frankfurt, Germany from August 2013 to July 2017. Kumar was the Official Spokesperson of the Ministry of External Affairs and Joint Secretary (External Publicity) from July 2017 till April 2020.

See also
Navtej Sarna
Taranjit Singh Sandhu
Harsh Vardhan Shringla

References 

Living people
Indian Foreign Service officers
Indian diplomats
1971 births
People from Bhagalpur